Gummadiol is a lignan hemiacetal. It can be isolated from the heartwood of Gmelina arborea.

References 

Lignans
Benzodioxoles
Lactols